Sipka is a surname. Notable people with the surname include:

 Ágnes Sipka (born 1954), Hungarian long-distance runner
 Danko Sipka (born 1962), Serbian-American linguist

See also